One US Bank Plaza (formerly One Mercantile Center) is a 36-story building in Downtown St. Louis, Missouri. In the 1990s the Ambassador Building next to it was razed and became part of the building's plaza.

The building has a Structural Expressionism style.  It was originally built for Mercantile Bancorporation which was bought out by Firstar in 1999 and then became U.S. Bancorp in 2001.

Major occupants 
Thompson Coburn, LLP
US Bank

See also
List of tallest buildings in Missouri
List of tallest buildings in St. Louis

References

Office buildings completed in 1976
Skyscraper office buildings in St. Louis
U.S. Bank buildings
Downtown St. Louis
Buildings and structures in St. Louis
1976 establishments in Missouri